Chinatown is the second album by The Be Good Tanyas, released in 2003.

Track listing
"It's Not Happening" (Frazey Ford) – 2:41
"Waiting Around to Die" (Townes Van Zandt) – 5:13
"Junkie Song" (Ford) – 3:47
"Ship Out On the Sea" (Ford) – 4:13
"Dogsong 2" (Samantha Parton) – 5:08
"Rowdy Blues" (Ford, Trish Klein) – 3:32
"Reuben" (Traditional; arranged by Jolie Holland, Parton, Ford, Klein) – 4:23
"The House of the Rising Sun" (Traditional; arranged by The Be Good Tanyas) – 3:49
"In Spite of All the Damage" (Ford) – 3:59
"Lonesome Blues"  (Parton) – 4:17
"In My Time of Dying" (Traditional; arranged by The Be Good Tanyas) – 3:43
"I Wish My Baby Was Born" (Traditional; arranged by Samantha Parton) – 3:50
"Horses" (The Be Good Tanyas]]) – 4:01
"Midnight Moonlight" (Peter Rowan) – 3:41

Personnel
Frazey Ford - guitar, mandolin (2), vocals
Samantha Parton - guitar, mandolin, ukulele, piano (5), vocals
Trish Klein - electric guitar, banjo, harmonica, acoustic guitar (9), mandolin (12), harmony vocals

Additional Personnel
Andrew Burden - double bass
Glenn "Ike" Eidsness - drums
Jolie Holland - fiddle (10), harmony vocals (5, 10)
Olu Dara - cornet (3, 13)
Paul Clifford - drums (5)
Aaron Chapman - saw (5)
Ketch Secor - fiddle (7)
Doug Thordarson - five-string viola & violin (5)
Roey Shemesh - double bass (1), bowed bass (5), fretless bass (4)
Diane Williams (Frazey's mom) - harmony vocals (14)
Martin Green - accordion (12)

References

2003 albums
The Be Good Tanyas albums